The Air Training Corps (ATC) is a British volunteer-military youth organisation. They are sponsored by the Ministry of Defence and the Royal Air Force. The majority of staff are volunteers, and some are paid for full-time work – including Commandant Air Cadets, a Full Term Reserve Service RAF officer. Although many ATC cadets go on to join the RAF or other services, the ATC is not a recruiting organisation for its parent service.

Activities include sport, adventure training (such as walking and paddle-sports), ceremonial drill, rifle shooting, fieldcraft, powered aircraft, glider flying, and other outdoor activities, as well as classification training leading up to a BTEC in Aviation Studies. Week-long trips to RAF stations, or camps offering adventure training or music, allow the opportunity for cadets to gain a taste of military life and often some flying experience in RAF gliders and RAF training aircraft such as the Grob Tutor. 

Cadet membership can begin from the start of School Year 8 (England and Wales), or equivalent in Scotland and Northern Ireland. New members will join with a rank of Cadet (however joining as "Training Flight" and being enrolled as a Cadet later on in their Cadet experience and later being more involved in a said squadron) and can earn positions of increasing responsibility in a military rank structure, as well as having increasing skill and competence recognised in a classification scheme (First Class, Leading, Senior, Master, and Instructor). As a cadet becomes more experienced with camps and activities, the skills they will acquire will be rewarded with a corresponding badge according to the skill achieved and how advanced the cadet is at that particular skill (e.g. drumming, shooting, leadership, first aid).

Service as a cadet ends at the age of 18, although cadets over the age of 18 can be extended until the age of 20 if appointed as Staff Cadets.

As of 1 April 2022, the ATC numbers 26,040 cadets (29% female) and 9,570 adult volunteers (30% female).

Together with the RAF contingents of the Combined Cadet Force, the ATC form the Royal Air Force Air Cadets, formerly known as the Air Cadet Organisation, part of the Community Cadet Forces.

History

Foundation 

Air Commodore Sir John Chamier is affectionately known as the "father of the air cadet movement". He joined the Royal Flying Corps (the forerunner of the Royal Air Force) where he served as a pilot in World War I, transferred to the Royal Air Force in 1918 and after retiring from the service in 1929, becoming Secretary-General of the Air League – an organisation made up of people who wanted to make the British public aware of the importance of military aviation. With the clouds of war beginning to form over Europe and the personal memory of how young men with only a few hours of training had been sent into air combat only to fall victim to well-trained enemy aviators, he conceived the idea of an aviation cadet corps.

Air Defence Cadet Corps 

The purpose of the Air Defence Cadet Corps (ADCC), set up in 1938 by Air Commodore Chamier, was to train young men in various aviation-related skills. The ADCC proved popular, with thousands joining up. In 1941, to provide the means of giving part-time air training to teenagers and young men who might later join the Royal Air Force, the ADCC was formally established as the Air Training Corps by Royal Warrant.

Air Training Corps 

On 5 February 1941, the Air Training Corps (ATC) was officially established, with King George VI agreeing to be the Air Commodore-in-Chief, and issuing a Royal Warrant setting out the Corps' aims. Within the first month of its existence, the size of the old ADCC, now the ATC, virtually doubled to more than 400 squadrons and continued to grow thereafter. A new badge was designed for the ATC and, once approved by the King, was distributed in August 1941. The motto ' Venture Adventure ', devised by Air Commodore Chamier, was adopted by the ATC and incorporated into the badge.

The new ATC squadrons adopted training programmes to prepare young men for entry into the Royal Air Force. Squadrons arranged visits to RAF and Fleet Air Arm stations as part of the cadets' training, where a flight might be a possibility. Such opportunities were not widely available, however, and many cadets were disappointed. One solution was to introduce opportunities for flying, as a way to allow a cadet to get the feel of an aircraft in flight and to handle an aircraft's controls whilst airborne. After the end of the Second World War, gliding lessons became available.

Before the 1980s, females were unable to join the ATC, although they were able to join an attached unit of the Girls Venture Corps (GVC) which had been formed in the early years of the Second World War, if one was available at their location. As of 2013, the GVCAC still exists, although in greatly reduced numbers due to competition from the ATC, and the two organisations no longer share a site.

Before May 2008, cadets would spend a lot of time in the classroom before obtaining First Class classification, studying the following subjects: The Air Training Corps, The Royal Air Force, History of Flight, Initial Expedition Training, Basic Communications and Airmanship I. After many lectures, and when the cadet felt ready, they would take a multiple choice examination, either on paper or on a computer. Some wings ran courses that would involve the cadet spending a few solid days learning and then awarded the appropriate classification if successful in their exams. In May 2008, HQ RAFAC decided to change the training programme for junior and second class cadets, sensing that recruits were being deterred by exams. In March 2016, after a review of the then current training-syllabus, the new "Progressive Training Syllabus" was introduced, which provided for four levels of each badge (blue, bronze, silver, and gold).

Investigation into sexual abuse 

In 2012, payouts made to victims of sexual abuse by the MOD, across all Cadet Forces, totaled £1,475,844. In 2013 payouts totaled £64,782, and in 2014 payouts totaled £544,213.

In 2017, a BBC Panorama episode entitled "Cadet Abuse Cover-Up" highlighted sexual abuse cases in the British Cadet Forces. In the years 2012 to 2017 there were 134 allegations of sexual abuse made against ATC volunteers, including historical allegations; 96 cases were referred to the Police for investigation, and 9 offenders were dismissed.

Air Cadet Organisation 

Until October 2017, advertising material such as leaflets and official websites branded the Air Training Corps and Combined Cadet Force collectively as the Air Cadet Organisation (ACO). This term was replaced by the Royal Air Force Air Cadets (RAFAC).

Structure and organisation 
The Air Training Corps has three parts – the officer and staff cadre (which comprises uniformed and civilian instructors), the Civilian Committee and the Chaplaincy.

The United Kingdom is split into six regions, each commanded by a Full-Time Reserve Group Captain in the RAF Reserves, and having a Regional Chairman and Regional Chaplain. Each region is sub-divided into many wings. There were historically six wings per region, however, as of 2013 there were 34 wings, most named after the one or two counties of the United Kingdom that they operate in. Wings are further sub-divided into sectors. Within the sectors lie squadrons, and it is the squadron that is the focal point for the majority of members of the Corps. As of 2019, there were 952 ATC squadrons and detached flights, each assigned to a wing.

The ATC is the largest part of the Royal Air Force Air Cadets (RAFAC), along with the RAF sections of the Combined Cadet Force.

Regions 

 Central & East Region
 London And South East Region (LASER)
 North Region
 Scotland & Northern Ireland Region
 South West Region
 Wales & West Region

Wings

National 
Headquarters Royal Air Force Air Cadets (HQ RAFAC, formerly Headquarters Air Cadets or HQAC) is based at RAF Cranwell in Lincolnshire. There are subordinate headquarters at region and wing levels, staffed by RAF and RAFAC officers and civil servants. HQ RAFAC controls two National Air Cadet Adventure Training Centres (NACATC) – at Fairbourne, Gwynedd, Wales and Windermere, Cumbria, England, which provide a range of adventure training courses and accommodation for squadron and wing expeditions. HQ RAFAC also controls ten Volunteer Gliding Squadrons around the UK, through the Air Cadet Central Gliding School at RAF Syerston.

Local 

ATC squadrons are established in most large towns in the United Kingdom. There are also units in Cyprus, Germany, Gibraltar, the Channel Islands, and the Isle of Man. In towns not large enough to sustain a squadron of 30 cadets, or as a supplement to an existing squadron in a larger town or city, a Detached Flight (DF) may be formed. A detached flight operates much like any other unit, but is a component part of a nearby, larger squadron.  there were over 912 ATC squadrons and 40 detached flights.

An Officer Commanding (OC) a squadron is a flight lieutenant (RAFAC). If a squadron commanded by an SNCO, warrant officer, pilot officer or flying officer, they are referred to as Officer in Charge (OIC) (unless they have completed their Squadron Commanders Course at RAF Cranwell then they retain the title of Officer Commanding). Officers were previously appointed in the Royal Air Force Volunteer Reserve (Training Branch) RAFVR(T) but now receive a Cadet Forces Commission, introduced in 2017. The OC has a good deal of autonomy in running their unit, along with the responsibility that goes with it. Where a unit has other members of staff, the OC allocates duties and provides recommendations on appointments, retentions and promotions. An OC of an ATC squadron can appoint cadets up to the rank of cadet flight sergeant (Cdt FS) without any external approval. Further cadet promotion to the rank of cadet warrant officer (CWO) requires recommendation being sent to their squadron's wing HQ.

The squadron warrant officer (Sqn WO) commonly holds the rank of warrant officer, or may be a senior non-commissioned officer (SNCO) if no warrant officer is available, and will typically have spent many years working within the squadron or the ATC.

The establishment of officers, WOs, senior NCOs and Cadet NCOs is dependent on the size of the squadron or detached flight and this basic structure has many permutations – varying with the number of cadets and staff, accommodation and facilities. A typical small detached flight may consist only of the Officer Commanding and fifteen cadets, while a large squadron can consist of upwards of 120 cadets and numerous staff.

Civilian committees 

A Civilian Committee (or "Civcom") underpins all local funding that the RAF cannot provide beyond core services for the squadron. Each is an independent charity and operates to meet the funding needs of the local squadron. Since the Cadet Forces Adult Volunteers (CFAV’s) and civilian instructors in the ATC have no financial responsibilities but still need money to manage and support cadet activities such as annual and overseas camps and adventure training, the funding responsibilities lie with the Civilian Committee. Serving as trustees, they are volunteers who support the cadet activities financially.

The RAFAC (ATC) is itself not a charitable organisation and is not itself a legal entity and so has no legal status. That defers to the MOD. For this and other reasons, the trustees within each Civilian Committee are required to be responsible for, and accountable for, the charitable fundraising of the squadron. As with any charity, three officers (Chairperson, Secretary and Treasurer) are elected at an AGM, possibly with the addition of a deputy chairperson, and then exist as an independent group to raise and manage funds in a lawful manner in accordance with the Charities Act. They do this under the status of an 'excepted charity' which requires that they conduct themselves wholly to the Charities Act 2011 but are excepted from sending in annual reports to the Charity Commission.

The squadron commander and chaplain are ex-officio members of their civilian committee and have no voting rights, however common-sense determines they may advise in squadron-related matters. While co-operation between the squadron and the civilian committee is desirable at all times, there is no line of command or authority of anyone other than the trustees of the Civilian Committee. This includes any uniformed personnel up to, and including, the Commandant Air Cadets.

A Civilian Committee is responsible for overseeing the initial unit formation and direction and will monitor the welfare of cadets. Civilian committees often include parents of cadets and retired ATC staff. Many squadron charities decide to operate against the RAFAC document known as ACP-11 which has been the traditional constitution. However, there is no requirement to do so as long as the civilian committee establishes a constitution with acceptable charitable object statements; these may be similar to those in ACP-11. The Charity Commission produced model constitutions of which the 'Model Constitution for a Small Charity' is used for the purpose of registering a charity at squadron level and this has been the route required for all squadrons in Scotland and Northern Ireland.

Any civilian committee in England and Wales that has an annual income that exceeds £5,000 in any one year, may register their charity with the Charity Commission. The charity commissions of Scotland and Northern Ireland require committees located in those countries to register and have done so for several years.

Culture

Aims and motto 

The Aims of the Air Training Corps, as set out in the Royal Warrant and approved by HM the Queen, late British sovereign, are:

 To promote and encourage among young men and women a practical interest in aviation and the Royal Air Force (RAF).
 To provide training which will be useful in both the Armed Forces and civilian life.
 To foster a spirit of adventure and to develop the qualities of leadership and good citizenship.

The corps motto is "Venture, Adventure".

In December 2015, Prince Philip, Duke of Edinburgh resigned from his role as honorary Air Commodore-in-Chief – having served in this role since 1953. On 16 December 2015, Prince Philip was succeeded as honorary Air Commodore-in-Chief by the then Duchess of Cambridge.

Oath 
Upon enrolment into the ATC, every cadet has to make the following promise, usually at a ceremony presided over by the unit's padre or commanding officer:

 "I, *Full Name*, hereby solemnly promise on my honour to serve my Unit loyally and to be faithful to my obligations as a member of the Air Training Corps. I further promise to be a good citizen and to do my duty to (God and^) the King, my Country and my Flag."

This promise is recorded by the cadet's signature in the cadet's Cadet Record of Service Book (RAF Form 3822). The promise has recently been rewritten to accommodate everyone, whether or not they are religious, by allowing the option to drop the "God and" from the oath.

Ensign 

The Air Training Corps Ensign is hoisted for every parade in the summer and hauled-down at dusk. It is treated with the same respect and dignity afforded to the Royal Air Force Ensign. In the event of poor weather conditions e.g. heavy rain or snowfall, the ensign would not be raised. If poor weather conditions are present whilst the ensign is raised, it would be hauled down at the soonest possible point. This is to avoid damage to the ensign and also as a mark of respect and discipline.

The ATC ensign is raised and lowered by a nominated member of the squadron, sometimes a cadet non-commissioned officer (NCO), member of staff, or simply a cadet who has been chosen, with the salute being taken by any commissioned officer, normally the squadron's Officer Commanding. All officers within view or earshot of the ensign salute during the hoisting and hauling down.

Most ATC wings and squadrons also have a banner, in addition to an ensign, which is paraded on formal occasions. The ATC also has a Corps Banner, which is afforded the same courtesies as an RAF Squadron Standard or the RAF Queens Colour, although its status is different.

Uniform 

All cadets are issued with a uniform that is derived from that worn by RAF personnel and are regulated by an extension to the RAF's dress regulations known as AP1358C.

Cadets primarily wear three uniforms:

 No 2 (Full) Service Dress, consisting of a light blue shirt and tie, a blue V-neck wool jumper, a brassard, blue-grey trousers or skirt/slacks and an RAF blue beret with an Air Training Corps cap badge. The jumper is removed in variation No 2A (Long Sleeved) Service Dress.
 No 2C Service Dress, as above but replacing the light blue shirt and tie with a dark blue shirt, worn with the top button undone. May be worn with or without the jumper.
 No 3 Service Dress - Field Clothing, consisting of either CS95 or PCS-MTP field clothing.

Other cadet uniforms do exist, such as mess dress and warm-weather service dress for overseas squadrons, however these are not issued to cadets unless the need arises.

Some squadrons differentiate themselves from each other at a local level. One such example would be different coloured pieces of cloth behind the cap badges on the beret, allowing cadet NCOs and CFAVs to distinguish between cadets of differing flights. However, this is an unofficial practice and not permitted on official parades. All uniform except black parade shoes and combat boots are provided at the expense of the Ministry of Defence.

Squadron insignia 
The first 50 squadrons that were formed retain an F to show they are "founder" squadrons, e.g. 10F (Luton) Squadron, 48F (Hampstead) Squadron or 1F (City of Leicester) Squadron. Only 30 of these are still in existence; the other 20 have disbanded over time. Some founder squadrons have reformed under Roman numerals, having been refused permission to re-assume the F; the first Squadron to do so was XIX (19 Crawley) Squadron, Sussex Wing. Although Brooklands Squadron was the first squadron to be established, it was given the squadron number of 11F due to a clerical error.

A Detached Flight uses its parent squadron number followed by the letters DF to show that it is a detached flight e.g. No 1408DF for No 1408 (Cranleigh) Detached Flight, raised by No 1408 (Dorking) Squadron.

Activities 

There are also opportunities for band music and many camps offer teenagers the chance to spend a week away from parents practising fieldcraft or receiving instruction in gliding and other outdoor pursuits. Many of these activities, including gliding, have a well-defined scale of achievement that a cadet can work to build up; this includes the leadership qualities reflected in an NCO structure.

Annual camps 

The ATC runs numerous annual camps each year, run on RAF stations so that cadets may get a taste of service life. Annual camps are organised at wing level with place for all squadrons, so that every cadet who wishes to and who has achieved at least the First Class qualification may take part. Cadets usually stay in RAF barrack blocks and eat in the station's mess facilities. The itinerary includes typical ATC activities such as drill, air experience flying, shooting, and adventure training. Cadets also have the opportunity to visit various sections of the station and meet the people who work there. Cadets may also have the opportunity to attend other sorts of annual camp, such as a locally (i.e. wing- or squadron-) organised camp based around adventure training or fieldcraft, or as guests on a camp run by one of the other cadet forces such as the Army Cadet Force or the Sea Cadet Corps. There are also Music camps for band members.

The largest camp of all is the Royal International Air Tattoo (RIAT) camp held annually in July at RAF Fairford. Each year more than 1,500 cadets and their staff spend between 1 and 3 weeks doing essential work in the preparation and the taking-down of the infrastructure of RIAT. On display days cadets have jobs to do and after the show weekend they are able to meet the crews and see the aeroplanes at close range.

Work experience camps 
Another option for more senior cadets are work experience camps. Whilst annual camps aim to give cadets a general taste of service life, the work experience camps cater for cadets who are interested in a specific trade, such as the RAF Regiment or RAF Police. However, in recent years, the opportunities for work experience placements have decreased. Cadets can, however, contact their local Armed Forces Careers Office (AFCO).

Overseas camps 
For older and more experienced cadets who have achieved the Leading Cadet qualification and have attended a UK Annual Camp, the corps also offers overseas camps. These are generally more relaxed and seen as a reward for hard-working and long-serving cadets. Since the end of the Cold War, and the closure of RAF stations in Germany, the number of overseas camp opportunities has decreased. As of 2007 the destinations for overseas camps are:

 RAF Akrotiri on Cyprus. A 7-day camp over the Easter school holiday period and at select other times of the year.
 RAF Gibraltar in Gibraltar.
 Sennelager Training Area in Germany
 JHQ Rheindahlen in Germany.
 USAF Ramstein in Germany. A camp at the base during the summer.
 International Four Days Marches in Nijmegen, The Netherlands, annually in July, where cadets complete a  walk during 4 days.

Former RAF bases that hosted overseas camps included RAF Laarbruch, RAF Gütersloh, and RAF Gatow.

Corps-wide trophies 
ATC squadrons each have a chance annually to win the two most prized trophies in the corps. The Sir Alan Lees trophy is awarded by the ATC commandant to the squadron with the best statistics and overall impression when inspected. The Morris Trophy is awarded to one of the 6 regional candidates upon inspection by the commandant.

The Foster Trophy is awarded to the cadet who has achieved the highest academic results in the entire corps over his/her time in the ATC, after finishing the cadet syllabus that leads to a BTEC Level 2 Certificate in Aviation Studies. In addition, there are also trophies presented annually by the Royal Air Forces Association. These trophies include the "Sir Douglas Bader Wings Appeal Trophy" for the ATC squadron collecting the most money on a per capita basis, The squadron achieving second place is awarded the "Sir Augustus Walker Trophy". The "Sir Robert Saundby Trophy" is awarded for collecting the highest net Wings Appeal amount.

The Quinton Memorial Trophy is a national award presented annually to the adult non-commissioned officer who has gained the top academic results in the senior non-commissioned officer initial courses held at the Air Cadet Adult Training Facility, Royal Air Force College, Cranwell. This trophy is named in honour of Flight Lieutenant John Quinton.

Cadet ranks

Cadets 

Young people who have begun their 2nd year of Secondary School (Year 8) and are under 16 3/4 years old can join the ATC. They are initially given the title 'recruit' and can go along to most meetings to get a feel for the ATC. Enrolment confers the status of Second Class Cadet and upon completion of the First Class syllabus, they become First Class Cadets and receive their First Class badge to be worn on their brassard. First class classification can take 3 to 6 months to reach, depending upon the squadron's activities and schedule. Once cadets have successfully completed lessons in a number of subjects and achieved first class classification, they are able to take part in almost all ATC activities. Those who stay on beyond 18 are known as Staff Cadets and wear rank slides denoting such. All cadets over the age of 18 must complete AVIP (Adult Volunteer Induction Programme) prior to their 18th birthday and must be DBS cleared. Once a Cadet has completed the AVIP, and subject to approval from the Cadet's Wing Commander their Cadet service is extended to their 20th birthday. After this point Cadet service is terminated.

All cadets are issued with a uniform and must each pay a small amount in subscriptions (or 'subs' as they are commonly known), usually around £50–£100 per year, although this can vary widely from squadron to squadron. Activities such as smallbore and fullbore target rifle shooting, flying and gliding are paid for from the budget of the Royal Air Force.

Cadet non-commissioned officers (NCOs) 
As cadets become more experienced, and if suitable, they can be promoted by their squadron's commanding officer (CO) to the status of cadet NCOs. Promotion to the rank of corporal, sergeant and flight sergeant is at the discretion of the Commanding Officer. They (or a representative) will make a decision based on merit and leadership potential – many squadrons have formal selection procedures including interviews, whilst others select by observing potential during normal training. All cadets, regardless of rank, must leave by age 20.

The Cadet NCO ranks within the ATC mirror those of the RAF's non-technical/non-flying trades and are, in ascending order of seniority:

It is common within the ATC to abbreviate these ranks by dropping the prefix "cadet". Cadet Warrant Officers are not addressed as Sir/Ma'am but as "Cadet Warrant", "Warrant Officer", or informally as "CWO" (pronounced si: wəʊ or alternatively as an acronym), the former being preferred by cadets and staff, in order to reduce ambiguity with the adult rank of Warrant Officer. This is the only rank in the Corps to accommodate the "Cadet" prefix upon being referred to by members of the Corps. This is to distinguish them from the adult staff, as they are at least 18 years of age and could easily be confused with an adult member of staff, or a serving member of the RAF.

Promotion to Cadet Warrant Officer is decided by a panel at wing level once a recommendation form has been submitted by the Officer Commanding of the prospective candidate's Squadron. Prospective candidates will be a Staff Cadet Flight Sergeant, preferably holding the Master Air Cadet classification (see below) and will be required to attend an interview with the wing commander or his/her representative. Once the Wing Commander approves the promotion to Cadet Warrant Officer, the recommendation is sent to HQ RAFAC at RAFC Cranwell. The recommendation will then receive final approval and a certificate of appointment will be issued to the successful candidate.

Staff cadets 
All cadets who are over the age of 18 must complete the AVIP (Adult Volunteer Induction Programme). These cadets wear a rank slide with the words 'STAFF CADET' embroidered below their rank insignia (or on plain slides for those of cadet rank). A staff cadet has extra responsibilities over cadets who are under the age of 18, including a duty of care to younger cadets. These cadets also hold enhanced Disclosure and Barring Service Certificates in the same way as adult staff.

Staff cadets are sometimes considered adult members of staff to some extent, however this is erroneous. Their ablutions and accommodation is however segregated from both adult staff and cadets.

Cadet classification syllabus 
Whilst not all cadets who join the ATC will be eligible for promotion, all cadets can progress through the training system and, by passing exams, achieve different classifications. The classification levels are Junior Cadet, Second Class Cadet (this is automatically achieved on enrolment), First Class Cadet, Leading Cadet, Senior Cadet and Master Air Cadet. To achieve these qualifications, cadets study a variety of subjects through tuition from the instructors and/or self-study from Ultilearn. Each successive qualification generally allows a cadet greater participation in ATC activities. Cadets who have achieved the Master air cadet classification have completed their academic training and could formerly attain a BTEC Level 2 in Aviation Studies (equivalent to 2 GCSEs A*–C) via CVQO.

The Method of Instruction course is not a classification as such, but rather a qualification. This allows them to teach other cadets a variety of subjects. Although this is not compulsory, ATC Wings ordinarily feed this hand-in-hand with the Staff Cadet Course (see below). Upon successful completion of this course, the cadet will be awarded a yellow lanyard to distinguish them. This is worn over the left shoulder and fastened to a small black Royal Air Force button or the left shirt pocket button when not wearing a jumper.

Marking methodology 
Leading Cadet, Senior Cadet and Master Air Cadet exams consist of assessment criteria each containing two questions. A cadet must achieve either 1 or 2 marks (50% or 100%) for each module in order to pass. All exams are taken online on a system called Ultilearn.

First Class Cadet 
First Class is also commonly referred to as 'Basic Training'. A variety of methods are used to test a cadet's understanding of the subject, including practical tests and exercises to test ability, and interviews/quizzes to test knowledge.
All junior cadets also have to pass a practical Drill Test to become first class. The drill test is a sequence of simple drill manoeuvres essential for forming squads and a good foundation to build on for more advanced drill.

Leading Cadet 
For a cadet to become a leading cadet, they must have already gained first-class status. They will then have to complete 3 examinations: Land Navigation, Principles of Flight and Airmanship Knowledge.

Senior and Master Cadet 
In September 2010, a new classification structure, syllabus and examination process came into force. 

The Senior Cadet badge shows a four bladed propeller with a small four pointed star in the centre in an X orientation, the Master Air Cadet badge for the brassard shows an ATC Falcon surrounded by laurel leaves.

For each badge, cadets must pass three of the following subjects, for Master Cadet they may not use the same three subjects they used on Senior Cadet.

The following subjects are available:

 Aircraft Handling and Flying Techniques
 Air Power
 Piston engine propulsion
 Jet engine propulsion
 Rocketry
 Air Frames
 Avionics and aircraft electrical systems
 Basic Air Navigation
 Basic principals of pilot navigation
 Advanced radio and radar
 Data Communications

Specialist Instructor and Leadership Qualifications 

With the change of the classification structure in September 2010 the classification of staff cadet changed to become Instructor Cadet. An Instructor Cadet is denoted by a yellow lanyard worn over the left shoulder. In 2019, the syllabus for attaining the yellow lanyard was updated. There is now no minimum classification needed to obtain it, but one must complete a presentation skills course and then complete the Method of Instruction. Previously to this, the Master Air Cadet classification was needed to obtain this lanyard.

Alongside Instructor Cadet there is another lanyard that can be awarded to cadets who are interested in specialising in teaching aerospace subjects. These qualified cadets are known as Qualified Aerospace Instructors (QAIs) and wear a light blue lanyard over the left shoulder. The Qualified Aerospace Instructors Course (QAIC) has been running since September 2008. The course is held at RAF Linton-On-Ouse and as of 2011 also at MOD Boscombe Down (As of RAF Linton-On-Ouse's closure in December 2020, the North centre was moved to Inskip Cadet Centre as of QAIC 14). The course is held from early September to Easter of the following year, beginning with a selection weekend in early September, and 7 total weekends (as of QAIC 8, prior to this there were only 6 training weekends) from late September until early March. The course culminates in a 'Graduation Week' which is organised to coincide with the Easter holidays to avoid clashing with school programmes. After completing training in various modules they carry out examinations in all modules (Air Traffic Control, air power, flight simulators, aerodynamics, and ITPS (Instructional Teaching and Presentation Skills)), satisfactory performance in all exams results in the cadet being awarded the pale blue QAIC lanyard and flight suit badge. Upon completion of the course, graduating students are offered affiliated membership to the Royal Aeronautical Society.

For those interested in fieldcraft teaching and leadership there is the Junior Leaders Course. Successful completion of the course awards the participant a maroon lanyard to be worn over the left shoulder and a junior leaders badge to sew on to the left sleeve of their No.3 Service Dress (field uniform) to show they are a qualified Junior Leader. The course runs from September to Easter, involving six weekend training camps and an assessment week. The course is aimed at more senior cadets, and as such an age restriction of 17 years applies. Not only this, but the course also requires the participant to hold the rank of Cadet Sergeant or higher. The course is also open to Sea Cadets and Army Cadets  and culminates in the award of a Level 3 Certificate in Leadership & Management from the Institute of Leadership and Management.

Adult staff and ranking 
Three categories of staff run the ATC at the unit level: commissioned officers, senior NCOs, and civilian instructors (CIs). All uniformed staff must attend training courses run by the RAF at the RAFAC Adult Training Facility, RAF College Cranwell (ATF), usually within a year of appointment, with further courses as they progress up the rank structure. Cadet Forces Adult Volunteers (CFAV’s) are non-combatants and there is no training for any form of active duty, or integration into the duties of other full-time or reserve duties. The CFAV is concerned only with the Air Cadets.

Officers 

Since December 2017, all RAFAC Officers are commissioned with a Cadet Forces Commission (CFC) and ranks framework, with previous RAFVR(T) Officers having their commissions transferred to CFC commissions.

Squadrons are usually commanded by CFC Flight Lieutenants & Flying Officers, who are also found as Wing and Regional staff officers, along with Squadron Leaders and Wing Commanders. Particularly large squadrons are sometimes commanded by Squadron Leaders (typically when the squadron has 100 or more cadets).

The most senior rank in the Cadet Forces Commission is that of Wing Commander, with the exception of the ambassador to the Air Cadets and the single Senior RAFAC Volunteer who both hold the honorary rank of Group Captain RAFAC, under a CFC. The current ambassador is Carol Vorderman.

Unless an officer has previous service in the Armed Forces, they are appointed as an Acting Pilot Officer until they complete the Officers Initial Course (OIC) at RAF Cranwell. They are then awarded a Cadet Forces Commission. Promotion to Flying Officer normally occurs after two years. Former regular commissioned officers are usually appointed as Flying Officers, subject to certain conditions being met. Upon becoming Officer Commanding of a squadron, completing a Squadron Commander's Course (SCC) and subject to certain conditions being met, officers may become eligible for promotion by either one or two ranks (in the case of a Flying Officer, promotion will not be more than one rank unless the Sqn size dictates such).

Ambassador to the Air Cadets 
In April 2013, Sir Chris Hoy was appointed the first Ambassador to the Royal Air Force Air Cadets and assumed the rank of Honorary Group Captain RAFVR(T).

In November 2014, Carol Vorderman accepted the appointment of Ambassador to the Royal Air Force Air Cadets, saying: "I am truly honoured to be appointed as an ambassador for the RAF Air Cadets. I can't wait to meet the cadets, and the adult volunteer staff who give so much of their time to support them. The cadets themselves are a shining example of the best of British youngsters, standing with them on a parade square will be a great privilege." Vorderman assumed the rank of Honorary Group Captain RAFVR(T) (changed to Group Captain RAFAC from December 2017) for the duration of her appointment. She is the first female to be appointed Ambassador.

In November 2021, rower Emma Wolstenholme was appointed Wing Commander (RAFAC) and Honorary Ambassador to the Air Cadets. She is a former serving Royal Air Force officer and plans to row solo across the Atlantic Ocean in early 2022.

NCOs and WOs 
Adults may also be appointed as senior NCOs, these being ranks within the ATC. Adult NCOs/WOs are uniformed in the same way as their RAF counterparts except that the embroidered text of "RAF AIR CADETS" appears below the rank insignia.

Since December 2017, ATC SNCOs and WOs had their ranks transferred to the new RAFAC commissions and ranks framework. A gilt RAFAC badge is worn on the lapels when in No.1 dress uniform to denote membership within the cadet forces.

In 2020, all RAFAC Warrant Officers and Warrant Officers (Aircrew) were granted use of the Royal Arms insignia to bring the RAFAC other ranks insignia into line with those of their Royal Air Force counterparts.

Staff Ranks Pre-December 2017 
Officers were previously commissioned into the Training Branch of the Royal Air Force Volunteer Reserve – the RAFVR(T). They previously wore a gilt 'VRT' pin upon their rank braid, while Warrant Officers and NCOs wore a gilt 'ATC' pin. The ranks of Adult NCOs/WOs were Sergeant (ATC), Flight Sergeant (ATC) and Warrant Officer (ATC).

Civilian instructors and chaplains 
Civilian instructors, known as CIs, play an important role in training cadets and unlike adult NCOs and officers, CIs do not wear a uniform. A civilian instructor's recognised dress consists of a light-blue polo shirt and dark-blue sweatshirt bearing the name of the corps and "Royal Air Force Air Cadets", in an effort to standardise the means by which CIs are identified. CI's are addressed as Sir or Ma'am by cadets when speaking to them or Mr, Mrs, Miss then surname by staff speaking to them or by anyone who is referring to them.

Many CIs are ex-RAF or ex-military and bring skills that complement the aims of the ATC. Whilst they do not form part of the squadron chain of command, in some circumstances they may hold positions within the squadron such as the adjutant or training officer.

Similarly, ATC chaplains are usually civilian members of the local clergy (although forces chaplains may join as Service Instructors). The role of an ATC chaplain is to 'provide appropriate pastoral care for all personnel within the Air Cadet Organisation irrespective of religious belief or status'. A chaplain's role in the local squadron is to offer guidance and leadership to cadets and members of staff on moral and spiritual matters. The commitment expected of a chaplain is a monthly visit to lead what is termed 'the Padre's hour' and to conduct the formal Enrolment Service when new cadets join. ATC chaplains are supported by the RAF Chaplain's Branch. ATC Chaplains do not wear uniform but are recognised by a Chaplain's badge on their lapel and a larger version on their preaching scarf. Even if it is not their custom to do so, ATC chaplains are expected to wear a clerical collar when on an RAF station. The equivalent No 2 working dress for a chaplain is a dark sweater with Chaplain's badge and a clerical collar.

Service instructors 
Members of the full-time (Regular) and part-time (Reserve) Armed Forces often assist at ATC Squadrons in the role of Service Instructor – they engage in instructional duties which are often related to their serving role. Service Instructors wear the uniform of their parent unit and are addressed appropriately, with ranks junior to NCO being addressed as "Staff".

See also 
 Sea Cadet Corps
 Royal Marines Cadets
 Army Cadet Force
Other MoD sponsored or recognised cadet forces
 Volunteer Cadet Corps
 Combined Cadet Force
RAF Air Cadets
 Air Experience Flight
 Volunteer Gliding Squadrons
Other Air Cadet organisations
 Australian Air Force Cadets
 Royal Canadian Air Cadets
 Civil Air Patrol
 Hong Kong Air Cadet Corps
 New Zealand Air Training Corps
Related articles
 Reserve Forces and Cadets Association
 Cadet Vocational Qualification Organisation (CVQO)
 Girls Venture Corps Air Cadets
 National Association of Training Corps for Girls

Notes

References

External links 
 The Air Cadet Organisation The official ATC website – includes links to many Region, Wing and Squadron websites.
 ATC Squadron Finder A searchable list of all ATC Squadrons and their contact details
 Air Cadets Squadron Finder Provides details of all Squadrons including address & location map, contacts details, parade times & Squadron website

 
Royal Air Force
Air Cadet organisations
British Cadet organisations
Youth organisations based in the United Kingdom
Organisations based in Lincolnshire
Youth organizations established in 1941
1941 establishments in the United Kingdom